Dilfareb (English ; Seductive) is a 2015 Pakistani drama serial directed by Amin Iqbal, and written by Zafar Mairaj. The drama stars Omair Rana, Mira Sethi and Alia Butt in lead roles, and first aired on 22 May 2015 on Geo Entertainment, on Friday, Saturday and Sunday at 8:00P.m. The story revolves around a love triangle of a charming young man Zain, Dr.Gul Bakht and Natasha.

Plot 
Zain (Omair Rana) has been in search of a soulmate for quite long. When he meets Natasha (Ameesha Butt), he thinks he has finally met the girl of his dreams. Soon he finds that she tricked him by giving him wrong contact details. He loses hope of finding her again and fate introduces him to Dr. Gul Bakht (Mira Sethi), whom he proposes due to his mom’s wish. 

Twist in the story comes when Zain crosses paths with the bubbly Mashal as she is Dr. Gul Bakht’s friend. He is surprisingly attracted towards her, and is convinced that she is his true soulmate. This intense love triangle is mixed with happiness, love, disappointment and jealousy.

Cast
Omair Rana as Zain
Mira Sethi as Gul Bakht
 Alia Butt as Natasha
Saba Hameed as Zain's mother
Ameesha Butt
Zainab Qayyum
Ghulam Mohiuddin as Zain's father	
Jana Malik

References

Pakistani drama television series
2015 Pakistani television series debuts